The major industries of Tasmania, have been: mining, agriculture, aquaculture, fishing, forestry; and tourism. Mining has including copper, zinc, tin, iron and gold. Food production has included salmon, beef, chicken, pork, dairy and lamb farming, as well as a variety of fruits and vegetables. Apples, pears, strawberries, raspberries, carrots and many varieties of potatoes are produced. Tasmania is known for its wild abalone and crayfish. The crayfish in the local waters, are one of the largest species of rock lobsters in the world, and fetches top prices in northern Pacific market.

In the past, there has been a strong local news commentary on mining and logging in Tasmania. While these industries still play a major role in the states economy, tourism has increasingly become a backbone to Tasmania's economy. Tourists, from overseas and interstate, come to Tasmania each year for the island's natural environment, clean air, and food and drink products.

Major employers include the Tasmanian State Government, Federal Group, Incat, MyState Limited and Tassal.

Economic conditions 
With a gross state product per capita of $AUD 50,237 (2015-2016) Tasmania is rich by world standards. Converted to US dollars on the 3-March-2017 this amount is $US 38,354.21. If Tasmania was a separate country, this would place it as the 21st richest country in the world, on a GDP per capita basis. This statement is based on the International Monetary Fund's ranking in 2015.

, Hobart, the state's capital, had domestic rental vacancy rates of 0.9 per cent for houses and 1.6 per cent for units, the highest rates in the country. This has caused a shortage of rental accommodation. Hobart's average house price in December 2016 was $AUD 345,000. Making it the most affordable capital province in Australia to buy a house.

Tasmania's unemployment rate in January 2017 was 5.9% in trend terms and 5.6% seasonally adjusted.

Exports
In 2015-2016 the top five countries Tasmania exported to were China, Taiwan, Malaysia, the US, and Japan, with the combined total of China and Taiwan dwarfing all other export country locations several times over.

Of the exported products in 2015-2016, processed metals and metal products was the top category in dollar value terms. Of the total $AUD 2.853 billion of states exports, this category generated $AUD 1.216 billion in sales. The next top four export categories where; Ores and concentrates, meat products, seafood products and dairy products. From 2011 to 2016 wood and paper product exports has declined by close to 50%.

Tourism and hospitality
Tourism is a large contributor to the state's economy.

For the year ending September 2016, there were 1.19 million visitors, up 4 per cent from 1.14 for the previous year. Total nights spent by visitors in the state increased by 8 per cent to 10.58 million. Visitor expenditure increased by 8 per cent to $AUD 2.07 billion. The number of interstate visitors to Tasmania increased by 3 per cent to 1.01 million (was 982,000). To place this in context, the total estimated population in June 2016 of Tasmania was 519,128.  Which means more than double the states population are tourist visitors over a year period.

Agriculture
Meat and dairy production had a net revenue of $AUD 1.49 billion in 2011-2012, which represented over a third of food production revenue. Dairy production was the only livestock-related sector with an increase from 2004-2005, with $AUD 668.8 million net revenue in 2011-2012

ICT industry
The total estimated revenue, for the information and communications technology industry, in Tasmania for 2010 was $AUD 1,137 million.

Revenue estimates for Tasmanian ICT Industry by sector in 2010:
Computer services: $A 313 million
Manufacturing: $A 20 million
Wholesale Trade: $A 65 million
Telecommunications: $A 738 million

Energy

The energy supply industry is of fundamental importance to the Tasmanian economy. It makes a significant contribution in its own right by way of employment, investment and its contribution to the State budget by way of taxes and dividends. In addition, the price and reliability of the supply of electricity impact on the economic performance of other sectors of the Tasmanian economy.

Electricity
A large proportion of Tasmania's power is produced by hydro-electric means. There are also a number of wind farms producing electricity. An underwater power cable,  links Tasmania to mainland Australia. This connection was established in 2005. It allows for surplus electricity to be sold into the national grid. Alternatively electricity supply can also be imported if needed. The vast majority of the states power supply is classified as green energy. 
  
In a 2009 report, Tasmania's electricity consumption and supply was:

 Electricity Consumption: 10,441 GWh (average 2004-2009)
 Residential: 1,984 GWh (19%)
 Commercial and Industrial: 8,457 GWh (81%)
 Electricity Supply: 11,049 GWh (2007-2008)
 Hydro: 7,100 GWh (64.3%)
 HVDC mainland link net inflow: 2,293 GWh (20.8%)
 Gas: 1,200 GWh (10.9%)
 Wind: 429 GWh (3.9%)
 Landfill: 27 GWh (0.2%)

See also
 Economy of Australia

References